Lake Gross is an oval-shaped lake. The Polk County Water Atlas says it is sometimes known as Lake Grassy or Lake Grass, but no other sources have used these names. Lake Gross is a natural freshwater lake with an  surface area. This lake is on the south fringe of Winter Haven, Florida. On the north Lake Gross is bordered by a small mobile home/RV park and on the west it is bordered by another such park, although this one is much larger. On the northeast, east and south, Lake Gross is bordered by pasture.

There is no public access to Lake Gross, as its shores nowhere border public property. It has only private boat docks and no swimming areas. Although there is nowhere for the fishing public to access the lake, the Hook and Bullet website says Lake Gross contains largemouth bass, bluegill and crappie.

References

Lakes of Polk County, Florida